Engineering Emmy Awards, recognizing outstanding achievement in engineering development in the television industry, are presented at the following ceremonies:
 Primetime Engineering Emmy Awards, presented by the Academy of Television Arts & Sciences.
 Technology and Engineering Emmy Awards, presented by the National Academy of Television Arts and Sciences.

Emmy Awards